Innocenzo Ciocchi del Monte ( – 1577) was a notorious cardinal whose relationship with Pope Julius III (born Giovanni Maria Ciocchi del Monte) caused grave scandal in the early 16th century. Born in Borgo San Donnino (now Fidenza) to a beggar-woman and an unknown father, he was picked up in the street by Cardinal Giovanni Maria Ciocchi del Monte and given a position in the household of the Cardinal's brother, Baldovino.

Cardinal Giovanni del Monte was elected Pope in 1550, taking the name Julius III. He subsequently arranged for Baldovino to adopt Innocenzo, and appointed him as Cardinal-Nephew – the papacy's chief diplomatic and political agent. He proved totally unsuited to any of these offices, and his continuing relationship with Julius, whose bed he openly shared, created considerable scandal both inside and outside the Church. After Julius's death, he was shunned and ignored. Despite committing both rape and murder, he managed to retain his cardinal's hat and was permitted to return to Rome following several periods of banishment. His death passed unremarked, and he was buried in the Del Monte family chapel in Rome.

Early life 

Innocenzo was born in Borgo San Donnino (now Fidenza) to a beggar-woman and an unknown father. As a boy he was illiterate but vivacious and good-looking. He left home at an extremely early age and made his way to Piacenza, where, at around 13 or 14, he found a position in the household of the city governor, Baldovino Ciocchi del Monte, as a valero, a menial role combining the offices of footman and dogsbody. His father may have been a soldier who had served with Baldovino, which would explain how he came into the household; although alternative stories were told that he had been picked up in the streets by Baldovino's brother, Cardinal Giovanni Maria Ciocchi del Monte. He certainly quickly became a favourite of Giovanni Maria, who placed him in charge of his pet monkey and appointed him provost of the cathedral chapter of Arezzo, a title involving only nominal duties but with certain rights of income.

Favourite of Pope Julius 
In February 1550 Cardinal Giovanni del Monte was elected Pope as Julius III, and immediately made the boy a Cardinal. Two years later, faced with hostility to Innocenzo from the other Cardinals and a gathering move to have his position annulled on the basis of his illegitimacy and age, Julius had him adopted into the Del Monte family and decreed his year of birth as 1532, although this had previously been unknown.

Attempts to give the boy an education which could have prepared him for ecclesiastic office had already proven useless: "a few social graces, a few bits of knowledge, perhaps about the glories of the Classical world, and Innocenzo's formal education was over." 

The new cardinal was given numerous important and lucrative positions, including commendatary abbot of the abbeys of Saint-Michel du Tréport in Normandy, S. Zeno in Verona, and of the abbeys of S. Saba, Miramondo, and of Grottaferrata, Frascati. Most significantly, Julius named him Cardinal-Nephew, effectively putting him in charge of all papal correspondence. But the role of secretary to the papacy proved manifestly beyond Innocenzo's abilities, and so, in order to find a way for his favourite to retain the appearance of power without having any real responsibility, Julius upgraded a hitherto minor position, that of secretary intimus, which, as Cardinal Secretary of State, was eventually to become the highest of Vatican offices. Innocenzo, although relieved of all real duties, continued to be showered with benefices and high offices, much to the disgust of his fellow cardinals.

Cardinals who were more sensitive to the need to reform the mores of the Church in order to combat the Protestant Reformation protested in vain against Innocenzo's elevation. Rumours also circulated around European courts: The Venetian ambassador, Matteo Dandolo, wrote that Cardinal Del Monte "was a little scoundrel", and that the Pope "took him [Innocenzo] into his bedroom and into his own bed as if he were his own son or grandson". Onofrio Panvinio wrote that Julius was "excessively given to intemperance in a life of luxuriousness and to his libido", and, more explicitly characterized him as "puerorum amoribus implicitus" ('entangled in love for boys'). One more mocking rumour made the rounds in Rome, saying that Innocenzo had been made a cardinal as a reward for his being the keeper of the pope's monkey. The French poet Joachim du Bellay, who lived in Rome during this period, wrote in 1555: "Yet seeing a footman, a child, a beast,/ a rascal, a poltroon made a cardinal / for having taken care of a monkey well, / a Ganymede wearing the red hat on his head / ...these are miracles, my dear Morel, that take place in Rome alone."

Innocenzo's affair with his future sister-in-law, the noted poetess and favorite in the papal court, Ersilia Cortese, resulted in scandal. Julius considered demoting him from the cardinalate after having compromised the pope's credibility.

In 1562 he was given the titular church of San Callisto.

Crimes and banishment 

After the death of Julius, Innocenzo took part in the two papal conclaves of 1555. In 1559, on the way to a third conclave from Venice he murdered two men, a father and son in Nocera Umbra who had "uttered ill words about him". For this crime he was arrested and imprisoned in the Castel Sant'Angelo, by order of Pope Pius IV; and the following year he was moved to the abbey of Montecassino, and placed in solitary confinement. Following the intervention of Cosimo I de' Medici, duke of Florence, Innocenzo was released but nevertheless forced to face a fine of 100,000 scudi, and threatened with the stripping of his cardinalate. From Rome, Innocenzo was banished to Tivoli, but returned to take part in the conclave of 1564. 

He also participated in the conclave of 1565–1566, which elected Pope Pius V; because of his aura of mischief, the guards searched him and discovered a note hidden in his cloak which contained forbidden information; this discovery caused an incredible stir and from that moment until the end of the conclave, Innocenzo and his conclavists were guarded more closely than any other cardinal in the conclave. 

In 1567, Innocenzo was accused of raping two low-class women in Brevia, near Siena. Charges were brought against him and he was brought to Rome with two Theatine priests assigned to act as guards. An investigation recommended against his execution or degradation, but he was nevertheless once again banished by Pope Pius V to Montecassino and then Bergamo. From there, Innocenzo worked with friendly cardinals to petition the new pope to release him from the monastery. To strengthen the case for his release, and to demonstrate that his outlook and attitude had changed, he began to project the image of a reformed prelate. Pope Gregory XIII restored Innocenzo's freedom and allowed him to return to Rome:"[b]ut his crown did not mean what it once did, because upon his return, Innocenzo was, once again, despised by all."

Death and burial 

Innocenzo died in Rome on 2 November 1577 and was buried within a few hours, in complete anonymity, beneath an unmarked slab in the Del Monte family chapel at the church of San Pietro in Montorio, Rome. "His burial was unattended. There was no commemoration of his cardinalate, and no prayers for the repose of his soul. Shunned and ignored in life, he was forgotten in death."

References

Bibliography

 

1530s births
1577 deaths
People from Fidenza
16th-century Italian cardinals
Bishops of Mirepoix
Cardinal-nephews
Innocenzo
Italian murderers